The 4th Parliament of Pakistan was the unicameral legislature of Pakistan formed after the 3rd Parliament of Pakistan. There were 156 Members of Parliament, including 78 from East Pakistan and 78 from West Pakistan.

East Bengal

 SM Ishaque Ali(Mymensingh-IX)
 Abdul Awal (Dacca-V)
 Abdul Awal Bhuiya (Comilla-III)
 Abdul Awal Khan (Rangpur-II)
 Abdul Hai (Noakhali-III)
 Abdullah al-Mahmood (Pabna-II)
 Abdur Bakaul (Faridpur-III)
 Mahtab Uddin Ahmad (Dacca-I)
 Abul Quasem (Rangpur-cum-Mymensingh)
 A.B.M. Nurul Islam (Faridpur-cum-Dacca)
 Afazuddin Faqir (Mymensingh-II)
 Aftabuddin Chowdhury (Mymensingh-VI)
 Ahmed Ali Sardar (Jessore-II)
 A. H. M. Qamaruzzaman (Rajshahi-III)
 A.K.M. Fazlul Quader (Chittagong-II)
 Abd-Allah Zaheer-ud-Deen (Faridpur-I)
 Md. Keramat Ali (Sylhet-III)
 Ajmal Ali (Sylhet-II)
 Altaf Hossain Sikdar (Jessore-I)
 Aminul Islam Chowdhury (Comilla-cum-Noakhali)
 A.S.M. Sulaiman (Dacca-VI)
 Athar Ali Khan (Bakerganj-cum-Khulna)
 Ataur Rahman Khan (Rangpur-III)
 A. T. M. Abdul Mateen (Comilla-IV)
 Azizur Rahman Mollah (Comilla-I)
 Moulvi Sultan Ahmed (Chittagong-I)
 Yar Ali Khan (Chittagong-IV)
 Begum Mariam Hashimuddin (Women's Constituency-I)
 Begum Razia Faiz (Women's Constituency-III)
 Aleem al-Razee (Mymensingh-I)
 Habibur Rahman (Bogra-I)
 Sharafat Uddin Ahmad (Mymensingh-IV)
 Fakhruddin Ahmed (Mymensingh-V)
 Giashuddin Chowdhury (Chittagong-cum-Chittagong Hill Tracts)
 Habibur Rahman (Bogra-II)
 Hemayetuddin Ahmed (Khulna-I)
 Ismail Khan (Bakerganj-V)
 Abdul Jabbar Khan (Bakerganj-II)
 Kazi Abdul Majid (Rajshahi-IV)
 Khan Fazle Rub Chowdhury (Bakerganj-II)
 Khurshed Ahmed Khan (Mymensingh-X)
 Begum Doly Azad (Women's Constituency-II)
 Master Abdul Aziz (Bakerganj-IV)
 Md. Abdul Gafur (Khulna-III)
 Mahmud Ali (Sylhet-I)
 Mahtabuddin Sarker (Rajshahi-II)
 Majibur Rahman Chowdhury (Rajshahi-I)
 Mohammad Owais (Rangpur-IV)
 Mashiur Rahman (Rangpur-V)
 Mizanur Rahman Chowdhury (Comilla-V)
 Abdur Rouf Khan (Dacca-II)
 Azizur Rahman (Comilla-II)
 Serajul Islam Chowdhury (Chittagong-IV)
 Mohammad Shahidullah (Dacca-VII)
 Mian Mansur Ali (Jessore-cum-Khsutia)
 Mobarak Ali (Jessore-III)
 Mohammad Abdul Matin (Pabna-III)
 N.A. Lashkar (Dhaka-III)
 Moulvi Ruhul Amin (Noakhali-II)
 Yusuf Ali (Dinajpur-II)
 Abul Hafez Mohsenuddin Ahmed (Faridpur-II)
 Mukhlesuzzaman Khan (Mymensingh-VIII)
 Muazzam Ahmed Choudhury (Sylhet-V)
 Nural Amin (Mymensingh-VII)
 Nural Hoda Choudhury (Dinajpur-cum-Bogra)
 Nural Haque (Dinajpur-I)
 Nurul Islam Sikder (Bakerganj-VI)
 Paniruddin Ahmed (Rangpur-I)
 Rahimullah Choudhury (Noakhali-I)
 Raisud-Din Ahmed (Mymensingh-III)
 Sajedul Hoque Mukhter (Comilla-VI)
 Shah Azizur Rahman (Kushtia-I)
 Shah Nazibul Huq (Bakderganj- II)
 S.K. Khairuddin (Dacca-IV)
 Asghar Hossain Zaidi (Pabna-I)
 S.M.A. Majeed (Khulna-II)
 Wahid-uz-Zaman (Faridupur-IV)

West Pakistan

 Abdul Hamid Khan Jatoi
 Afzal Mehdi Khan
 Ahmad Khan Ghuman
 A.K. Soomar
 Bashir Ahmed Khan
 Begum Jujeeb-un-Nisa
 Begum Khadija Khan
 Begum Zari Sarfraz
 Gohar Ayub Khan
 Jalil Ahmed Khan
 Chaudhry Muhammad Iqbal
 Chaudhury Abdur Rahim
 Khalid Jamil
 Ishaq Cheema
 Chaudhry Sultan Ahmad
 Ghulam Qutub Din
 Fazal Elahi Choudhury
 Fida Mohammad Khan
 Ghulam Mohammad Mustafa
 Ghulam Mustafa Jatoi
 Ghulam Muhammad Wasan
 Ghulam Rasul
 Hasan A. Shaikh
 Khuda Dad Khan
 Mohammad Saleem Khan
 Mohammad Shah Khisro
 Zulfiqar Ali Khan Qizilbash
 Malik Ali Shah Jamrud
 Malik Allah Yar Khan
 Malik Damsaz Khan
 Malik Darya Khan
 Malik Muhammad Anwar Khan
 Makhdum Muhammad Zaman
 Ghulam Miran Gilani
 Hamid Raza Gilani
 Mian Abdul Haque
 Mian Arif Iftikhar
 Miangul Aurangzeb
 Muzaffar Mehdi Hashmi
 Mian Rafique Saigol
 Mian Salah-ud-Din
 Mir Aijaz Ali
 Mir Darya Khan
 Nabi Bakhsh Zehri
 Muhammad Ashraf
 Ayub Khan (president)
 Haneef Khan
 Qasim Malik
 Akram Khan Bosan
 Muhammad Irshad Ullah
 Sajjad Hussain Makhdoom
 Muhammad Nawaz Khan
 Mumtaz Ali Bhutto
 Malik Muzaffar Khan
 Malik Nur Mohammad
 Mian Jamal Shah
 Abdul Ghafoor Khan
 Azmat Ali Khan
 Jam Sadik Ali
 Niwazish Ali Khan
 Noor Hayat Khan
 Syed Nadir Ali Shah
 Qamar-uz-Zaman Shah
 Ghulam Sabir Khan
 Sardar Abdul Hamid
 Doda Khan Zarakzai
 Ghulam Muhammad Shah
 Zadikali A. Memon
 Mohammad Abbas Abbasi
 Fazal Karim Khan
 Ghulam Muhammad Mahar
 Sardar Khizer Hayat Khan
 Mahmood Khan Leghari
 Sardar Aslam Khan
 S. Murid Hussain
 Ali Asghar Shah
 Abdul Khalil

Changes to Members of Fourth Constitutional Assembly

February, 1966
 Ghause Baksh
 Sultan Ali

August, 1966
 Mohammad Iqbal Malik

March, 1967
 Muazzam Hussain Khan
 Raja Lehrasib Khan

October, 1967
 Adeluddin Ahmad Howldar
 Nadir Khan Malik
 Khan Nasrullah Khan
 Mohammad Amir Khan
 Farid Ahmad

See also 

 List of members of the 1st National Assembly of Pakistan
 List of members of the 2nd National Assembly of Pakistan
 List of members of the 3rd National Assembly of Pakistan
 List of members of the 4th National Assembly of Pakistan
 List of members of the 5th National Assembly of Pakistan
 List of members of the 6th National Assembly of Pakistan
 List of members of the 7th National Assembly of Pakistan
 List of members of the 8th National Assembly of Pakistan
 List of members of the 9th National Assembly of Pakistan
 List of members of the 10th National Assembly of Pakistan
 List of members of the 11th National Assembly of Pakistan
 List of members of the 12th National Assembly of Pakistan
 List of members of the 13th National Assembly of Pakistan
 List of members of the 14th National Assembly of Pakistan
 List of members of the 15th National Assembly of Pakistan

References

External links
 National Assembly of Pakistan

 
Lists of members of the National Assembly of Pakistan by term